Maurice-Alexis Jarre (13 September 1924 – 28 March 2009) was a French composer and conductor. Although he composed several concert works, Jarre is best known for his film scores, particularly for his collaborations with film director David Lean. Jarre composed the scores to all of Lean's films from Lawrence of Arabia (1962) to A Passage to India (1984). He was nominated for nine Academy Awards, winning three in the Best Original Score category for Lawrence of Arabia (1962), Doctor Zhivago (1965), and A Passage to India (1984), all of which were directed by Lean.

Notable scores for other directors included Eyes Without a Face (1959), The Longest Day (1962), The Train (1964), The Collector (1965), Grand Prix (1966), The Man Who Would Be King (1975), Mohammad, Messenger of God (1976), Jesus of Nazareth (1977), Lion of the Desert (1981), The Year of Living Dangerously (1982), Witness (1985), The Mosquito Coast (1986), Fatal Attraction (1987), Gorillas in the Mist (1988), Dead Poets Society (1989), and Ghost (1990). He worked with such directors as John Frankenheimer, Peter Weir, Georges Franju, John Huston, Adrian Lyne, Luchino Visconti, Alfred Hitchcock, Elia Kazan, and Volker Schlöndorff.

Jarre also won four Golden Globes, three BAFTA Awards, a Grammy Award, and a star on the Hollywood Walk of Fame. Three of his compositions spent a total of 42 weeks on the UK singles chart; the biggest hit was "Somewhere My Love" (to his tune "Lara's Theme", with lyrics by Paul Francis Webster) performed by the Mike Sammes Singers, which reached Number 14 in 1966 and spent 38 weeks on the chart.

He was the father of musician Jean-Michel Jarre and the adopted father of screenwriter Kevin Jarre.

Early life
Jarre was born in Lyon, the son of Gabrielle Renée (née Boullu) and André Jarre, a radio technical director. He first enrolled in the engineering school at the Sorbonne, but decided to pursue music courses instead. He left the Sorbonne against his father's will and enrolled at the Conservatoire de Paris to study composition and harmony and chose percussion as his major instrument. He became director of the Théâtre National Populaire and recorded his first film score in France in 1951.

Film scoring
In 1961, Jarre's music career experienced a major change when American film producer Sam Spiegel asked him to write the score for the 1962 epic Lawrence of Arabia, directed by David Lean. The acclaimed score won Jarre his first Academy Award and he would go on to compose the scores to all of Lean's subsequent films. He followed with The Train (1964) and Grand Prix (1966), both for director John Frankenheimer, and in between had another great success in David Lean's Doctor Zhivago, which included the lyricless tune "Lara's Theme" (later the tune for the song "Somewhere My Love"), and which earned him his second Oscar. He worked with Alfred Hitchcock on Topaz (1969): although Hitchcock's experiences with the film were unhappy, he was satisfied with Jarre's score, telling him, "I have not given you a great film, but you have given me a great score." His score for David Lean's Ryan's Daughter (1970), set in Ireland, completely eschews traditional Irish music styles, according to Lean's preferences. The song "It Was a Good Time," from Ryan's Daughter went on to be recorded by musical stars such as Liza Minnelli who used it in her critically acclaimed television special Liza with a Z as well as by others during the 1970s. He contributed the music for Luchino Visconti's The Damned (1969), and John Huston's The Man Who Would Be King (1975).

He was again nominated for an Academy Award for scoring The Message in 1976, for the director and producer Moustapha Akkad. He followed with Witness (1985) and Dead Poets Society (1989), for which he won a British Academy Award.

In the 1970s and 1980s, Jarre turned his hand to science fiction, with scores for The Island at the Top of the World (1974), Dreamscape (1984), Enemy Mine (1985), and Mad Max Beyond Thunderdome (1985). The latter is written for full orchestra, augmented by a chorus, four grand pianos, a pipe organ, digeridoo, fujara, a battery of exotic percussion, and three ondes Martenot, which feature in several of Jarre's other scores, including Lawrence of Arabia, Jesus of Nazareth, The Bride and Prancer. The balalaika features prominently in Jarre's score for Doctor Zhivago.

In 1990, Jarre was again nominated for an Academy Award scoring the supernatural love story/thriller Ghost. His music for the final scene of the film is based on "Unchained Melody" composed by fellow film composer Alex North. Other films for which he provided the music include A Walk in the Clouds (1995), for which he wrote the score and all of the songs, including the romantic "Mariachi Serenade". Also to his credit is the passionate love theme from Fatal Attraction (1987), and the moody electronic soundscapes of After Dark, My Sweet (1990). He was well respected by other composers including John Williams, who stated, on Jarre's death, "(He) is to be well remembered for his lasting contribution to film music ... we all have been enriched by his legacy."

Jarre's television work includes the theme for the short-lived 1967 Western series on CBS, Cimarron Strip, his score for the miniseries Jesus of Nazareth (1977), directed by Franco Zeffirelli, Shōgun (1980), and the theme for PBS's Great Performances.

Jarre scored his last project in 2001, a television mini-series about the Holocaust titled Uprising.

He was "one of the giants of 20th-century film music" who was "among the most sought-after composers in the movie industry" and "a creator of both subtle underscoring and grand, sweeping themes, not only writing for conventional orchestras ... but also experimenting with electronic sounds later in his career".

Music style
Jarre wrote mainly for orchestras, but began to favour synthesized music in the 1980s. Jarre pointed out that his electronic score for Witness was actually more laborious, time-consuming and expensive to produce than an orchestral score. Jarre's electronic scores from the 1980s also include Fatal Attraction, The Year of Living Dangerously, Firefox and No Way Out. A number of his scores from that era also feature electronic / acoustic blends, such as Gorillas in the Mist, Dead Poets Society, The Mosquito Coast and Jacob's Ladder.

Family
Jarre was married four times, the first three marriages ending in divorce. In the 1940s, his marriage to Francette Pejot, a French Resistance member and concentration camp survivor, produced a son, Jean-Michel Jarre, a French composer, performer, and music producer, who is one of the pioneers in electronic music. When Jean-Michel was five years old, Maurice split up with his wife and moved to the United States, leaving Jean-Michel with his mother in France.

In 1965, Jarre married French actress Dany Saval; together they had a daughter, Stephanie Jarre. He next married American actress Laura Devon (1967–1984), resulting in his adopting her son, Kevin Jarre, a screenwriter, with credits on such films as Tombstone and Glory (1989). From 1984 to his death, he was married to Fong F. Khong.

Death
Maurice Jarre died of cancer on 28 March 2009 in Los Angeles.

Awards
Jarre received three Academy Awards and received a total of nine nominations, eight for Best Original Score and one for Best Original Song. He also won four Golden Globes and was nominated for ten.

The American Film Institute ranked Jarre's score for Lawrence of Arabia #3 on their list of the greatest film scores. His scores for the following films were also nominated for the list:
 Doctor Zhivago (1965)
 A Passage to India (1984)
 Ryan's Daughter (1970)

Numerous additional awards include ASCAP's Lifetime Achievement Award in 1993.

Filmography

1950s

1960s

1970s

1980s

1990s

2000s

References

External links

 
 Filmography, soundtrack reviews, capsule biography
 Obituary by the Associated Press on Legacy.com
 

1924 births
2009 deaths
20th-century French composers
20th-century French male musicians
21st-century French composers
21st-century French male musicians
Barclay Records artists
Best Original Music BAFTA Award winners
Best Original Music Score Academy Award winners
Capitol Records artists
César Honorary Award recipients
Conservatoire de Paris alumni
Deaths from cancer in California
European Film Awards winners (people)
French expatriates in the United States
French film score composers
French male film score composers
Golden Globe Award-winning musicians
Grammy Award winners
Honorary Golden Bear recipients
MCA Records artists
MGM Records artists
Musicians from Lyon
Ondists
University of Paris alumni
Varèse Sarabande Records artists
Warner Records artists